Canaan (Phoenician: 𐤊𐤍𐤏𐤍 – ;  – , in pausa  – ;  – ;  – ) was a Semitic-speaking civilization and region of the Southern Levant in the Ancient Near East during the late 2nd millennium BC. Canaan had significant geopolitical importance in the Late Bronze Age Amarna Period (14th century BC) as the area where the spheres of interest of the Egyptian, Hittite, Mitanni and Assyrian Empires converged or overlapped. Much of present-day knowledge about Canaan stems from archaeological excavation in this area at sites such as Tel Hazor, Tel Megiddo, En Esur, and Gezer.

The name "Canaan" appears throughout the Bible as a geography associated with the "Promised Land". The demonym "Canaanites" serves as an ethnic catch-all term covering various indigenous populations—both settled and nomadic-pastoral groups—throughout the regions of the southern Levant or Canaan. It is by far the most frequently used ethnic term in the Bible. Biblical scholar Mark Smith, citing archaeological findings, suggests "that the Israelite culture largely overlapped with and derived from Canaanite culture... In short, Israelite culture was largely Canaanite in nature."

The name "Canaanites" is attested, many centuries later, as the endonym of the people later known to the Ancient Greeks from  BC as Phoenicians, and after the emigration of some Canaanite-speakers to Carthage (founded in the 9th century BC), was also used as a self-designation by the Punics (as ) of North Africa during Late Antiquity.

Etymology 
The English term "Canaan" (pronounced  since , due to the Great Vowel Shift) comes from the Hebrew , via the Koine Greek   and the Latin . It appears as Kinâḫna (KURki-na-aḫ-na) in the Amarna letters (14th century BC) and several other ancient Egyptian texts. In Greek, it first occurs in the writings of Hecataeus as "". It is attested in Phoenician on coins from Berytus dated to the 2nd century BCE.

The etymology is uncertain. An early explanation derives the term from the Semitic root , "to be low, humble, subjugated". Some scholars have suggested that this implies an original meaning of "lowlands", in contrast with Aram, which would then mean "highlands", whereas others have suggested it meant "the subjugated" as the name of Egypt's province in the Levant, and evolved into the proper name in a similar fashion to Provincia Nostra (the first Roman colony north of the Alps, which became Provence).

An alternative suggestion, put forward by Ephraim Avigdor Speiser in 1936, derives the term from Hurrian , purportedly referring to the colour purple, so that "Canaan" and "Phoenicia" would be synonyms ("Land of Purple"). Tablets found in the Hurrian city of Nuzi in the early 20th century appear to use the term  as a synonym for red or purple dye, laboriously produced by the Kassite rulers of Babylon from murex molluscs as early as 1600 BC, and on the Mediterranean coast by the Phoenicians from a byproduct of glassmaking. Purple cloth became a renowned Canaanite export commodity which is mentioned in Exodus. The dyes may have been named after their place of origin. The name 'Phoenicia' is connected with the Greek word for "purple", apparently referring to the same product, but it is difficult to state with certainty whether the Greek word came from the name, or vice versa. The purple cloth of Tyre in Phoenicia was well known far and wide and was associated by the Romans with nobility and royalty. However, according to Robert Drews, Speiser's proposal has generally been abandoned.

Archaeology and history

Overview

There are several periodization systems for Canaan. One of them is the following.

 Prior to 4500 BC (prehistory – Stone Age): hunter-gatherer societies slowly giving way to farming and herding societies
 4500–3500 BC (Chalcolithic): early metal-working and farming
 3500–2000 BC (Early Bronze): prior to written records in the area
 2000–1550 BC (Middle Bronze): city-states
 1550–1200 BC (Late Bronze): Egyptian hegemony
 1200–various dates by region (Iron Age)

After the Iron Age the periods are named after the various empires that ruled the region: Assyrian, Babylonian, Persian, Hellenistic (related to Greece) and Roman.

Canaanite culture developed in situ from multiple waves of migration merging with the earlier Circum-Arabian Nomadic Pastoral Complex, which in turn developed from a fusion of their ancestral Natufian and Harifian cultures with Pre-Pottery Neolithic B (PPNB) farming cultures, practicing animal domestication, during the 6200 BC climatic crisis which led to the Neolithic Revolution/First Agricultural Revolution in the Levant. The majority of Canaan is covered by the Eastern Mediterranean conifer–sclerophyllous–broadleaf forests ecoregion.

Chalcolithic (4500–3500) 

The first wave of migration, called Ghassulian culture, entered Canaan circa 4500 BC. This is the start of the Chalcolithic in Canaan. From their unknown homeland they brought an already complete craft tradition of metal work. They were expert coppersmiths; in fact, their work was the most advanced metal technology in the ancient world.  Their work is similar to artifacts from the later Maykop culture, leading some scholars to believe they represent two branches of an original metalworking tradition. Their main copper mine was at Wadi Feynan. The copper was mined from the Cambrian Burj Dolomite Shale Unit in the form of the mineral malachite. All of the copper was smelted at sites in Beersheba culture. They produced violin-shaped figurines similar to those in Cycladic culture and at Bark in North Mesopotamia.

Genetic analysis has shown that the Ghassulians belonged to Y-Halplogroup T1a1a.

The end of the Chalcolithic period saw the rise of the urban settlement of 'En Esur on the southern Mediterranean coast.

Early Bronze Age (3500–2000) 

By the Early Bronze Age other sites had developed, such as Ebla (where an East Semitic language, Eblaite, was spoken), which by  BC was incorporated into the Mesopotamia-based Akkadian Empire of Sargon the Great and Naram-Sin of Akkad (biblical Accad). Sumerian references to the Mar.tu ("tent dwellers", later Amurru, i.e. Amorite) country west of the Euphrates River date from even earlier than Sargon, at least to the reign of the Sumerian king, Enshakushanna of Uruk, and one tablet credits the early Sumerian king Lugal-Anne-Mundu with holding sway in the region, although this tablet is considered less credible because it was produced centuries later.

Amorites at Hazor, Kadesh (Qadesh-on-the-Orontes), and elsewhere in Amurru (Syria) bordered Canaan in the north and northeast. (Ugarit may be included among these Amoritic entities.) The collapse of the Akkadian Empire in 2154 BC saw the arrival of peoples using Khirbet Kerak ware (pottery), coming originally from the Zagros Mountains (in modern Iran) east of the Tigris. In addition, DNA analysis revealed that between 2500–1000 BC, populations from the Chalcolithic Zagros and Bronze Age Caucasus migrated to the Southern Levant.

The first cities in the southern Levant arose during this period. The major sites were 'En Esur and Meggido. These "proto-Canaanites" were in regular contact with the other peoples to their south such as Egypt, and to the north Asia Minor (Hurrians, Hattians, Hittites, Luwians) and Mesopotamia (Sumer, Akkad, Assyria), a trend that continued through the Iron Age. The end of the period is marked by the abandonment of the cities and a return to lifestyles based on farming villages and semi-nomadic herding, although specialised craft production continued and trade routes remained open. Archaeologically, the Late Bronze Age state of Ugarit (at Ras Shamra in Syria) is considered quintessentially Canaanite, even though its Ugaritic language does not belong to the Canaanite language group proper.

A disputed reference to Lord of ga-na-na in the Semitic Ebla tablets (dated 2350 BC) from the archive of Tell Mardikh has been interpreted by some scholars to mention the deity Dagon by the title "Lord of Canaan" If correct, this would suggest that Eblaites were conscious of Canaan as an entity by 2500 BC. Jonathan Tubb states that the term ga-na-na "may provide a third-millennium reference to Canaanite", while at the same time stating that the first certain reference is in the 18th century BC. See Ebla-Biblical controversy for further details.

Middle Bronze Age (2000–1550) 

Urbanism returned and the region was divided among small city-states, the most important of which seems to have been Hazor. Many aspects of Canaanite material culture now reflected a Mesopotamian influence, and the entire region became more tightly integrated into a vast international trading network.

As early as Naram-Sin of Akkad's reign ( BC), Amurru was called one of the "four quarters" surrounding Akkad, along with Subartu/Assyria, Sumer, and Elam. Amorite dynasties also came to dominate in much of Mesopotamia, including in Larsa, Isin and founding the state of Babylon in 1894 BC. Later on, Amurru became the Assyrian/Akkadian term for the interior of south as well as for northerly Canaan. At this time the Canaanite area seemed divided between two confederacies, one centred upon Megiddo in the Jezreel Valley, the second on the more northerly city of Kadesh on the Orontes River. An Amorite chieftain named Sumu-abum founded Babylon as an independent city-state in 1894 BC. One Amorite king of Babylonia, Hammurabi (1792–1750 BC), founded the First Babylonian Empire, which lasted only as long as his lifetime. Upon his death the Amorites were driven from Assyria but remained masters of Babylonia until 1595 BC, when they were ejected by the Hittites.

The semi-fictional Story of Sinuhe describes an Egyptian officer, Sinuhe, conducting military activities in the area of "Upper Retjenu" and "Fenekhu" during the reign of Senusret I ( BC). The earliest bona fide Egyptian report of a campaign to "Mentu", "Retjenu" and "Sekmem" (Shechem) is the Sebek-khu Stele, dated to the reign of Senusret III ( BC).

A letter from Mut-bisir to Shamshi-Adad I ( BC) of the Old Assyrian Empire (2025–1750 BC) has been translated: "It is in Rahisum that the brigands (habbatum) and the Canaanites (Kinahnum) are situated". It was found in 1973 in the ruins of Mari, an Assyrian outpost at that time in Syria. Additional unpublished references to Kinahnum in the Mari letters refer to the same episode. Whether the term Kinahnum refers to people from a specific region or rather people of "foreign origin" has been disputed, such that Robert Drews states that the "first certain cuneiform reference" to Canaan is found on the Alalakh statue of King Idrimi (below).

A reference to Ammiya being "in the land of Canaan" is found on the Statue of Idrimi (16th century BC) from Alalakh in modern Syria. After a popular uprising against his rule, Idrimi was forced into exile with his mother's relatives to seek refuge in "the land of Canaan", where he prepared for an eventual attack to recover his city. The other references in the Alalakh texts are:
 AT 154 (unpublished)
 AT 181: A list of 'Apiru people with their origins. All are towns, except for Canaan
 AT 188: A list of Muskenu people with their origins. All are towns, except for three lands including Canaan
 AT 48: A contract with a Canaanite hunter.

Around 1650 BC, Canaanites invaded the eastern Nile delta, where, known as the Hyksos, they became the dominant power. In Egyptian inscriptions, Amar and Amurru (Amorites) are applied strictly to the more northerly mountain region east of Phoenicia, extending to the Orontes.

Archaeological excavations of a number of sites, later identified as Canaanite, show that prosperity of the region reached its apogee during this Middle Bronze Age period, under the leadership of the city of Hazor, at least nominally tributary to Egypt for much of the period. In the north, the cities of Yamkhad and Qatna were hegemons of important confederacies, and it would appear that biblical Hazor was the chief city of another important coalition in the south.

Late Bronze Age (1550–1200) 
In the early Late Bronze Age, Canaanite confederacies centered on Megiddo and Kadesh, before being fully brought into the Egyptian Empire and Hittite Empire. Later still, the Neo-Assyrian Empire assimilated the region.

According to the Bible, the migrant ancient Semitic-speaking peoples who appear to have settled in the region included (among others) the Amorites, who had earlier controlled Babylonia. The Hebrew Bible mentions the Amorites in the Table of Peoples (Book of Genesis 10:16–18a). Evidently, the Amorites played a significant role in the early history of Canaan. In Book of Genesis 14:7 f., Book of Joshua 10:5 f., Book of Deuteronomy 1:19 f., 27, 44, we find them located in the southern mountain country, while verses such as Book of Numbers 21:13, Book of Joshua 9:10, 24:8, 12, etc., tell of two great Amorite kings residing at Heshbon and Ashteroth, east of the Jordan. However, other passages such as Book of Genesis 15:16, 48:22, Book of Joshua 24:15, Book of Judges 1:34, as well as others regard the name Amorite as synonymous with "Canaanite"; however, "Amorite" is never used for the population on the coast.In the centuries preceding the appearance of the biblical Hebrews, parts of Canaan and southwestern Syria became tributary to the Egyptian pharaohs, although domination by the Egyptians remained sporadic, and not strong enough to prevent frequent local rebellions and inter-city struggles. Other areas such as northern Canaan and northern Syria came to be ruled by the Assyrians during this period.

Under Thutmose III (1479–1426 BC) and Amenhotep II (1427–1400 BC), the regular presence of the strong hand of the Egyptian ruler and his armies kept the Amorites and Canaanites sufficiently loyal. Nevertheless, Thutmose III reported a new and troubling element in the population. Habiru or (in Egyptian) 'Apiru, are reported for the first time. These seem to have been mercenaries, brigands, or outlaws, who may have at one time led a settled life, but with bad luck or due to the force of circumstances, contributed a rootless element to the population, prepared to hire themselves to whichever local mayor, king, or princeling would pay for their support.

Although Habiru  (a Sumerian ideogram glossed as "brigand" in Akkadian), and sometimes  (an Akkadian word) had been reported in Mesopotamia from the reign of the Sumerian king, Shulgi of Ur III, their appearance in Canaan appears to have been due to the arrival of a new state based in Asia Minor to the north of Assyria and based upon a Maryannu aristocracy of horse-drawn charioteers, associated with the Indo-Aryan rulers of the Hurrians, known as Mitanni.

The Habiru seem to have been more a social class than an ethnic group. One analysis shows that the majority were Hurrian, although there were a number of Semites and even some Kassite and Luwian adventurers amongst their number. The reign of Amenhotep III, as a result, was not quite so tranquil for the Asiatic province, as Habiru/'Apiru contributed to greater political instability. It is believed that turbulent chiefs began to seek their opportunities, although as a rule they could not find them without the help of a neighbouring king. The boldest of the disaffected nobles was Aziru, son of Abdi-Ashirta, who endeavoured to extend his power into the plain of Damascus. Akizzi, governor of Katna (Qatna?) (near Hamath), reported this to Amenhotep III, who seems to have sought to frustrate Aziru's attempts. In the reign of the next pharaoh, Akhenaten (reigned  1352 to  1335 BC) both father and son caused infinite trouble to loyal servants of Egypt like Rib-Hadda, governor of Gubla (Gebal), by transferring their loyalty from the Egyptian crown to the Hittite Empire under Suppiluliuma I (reigned  1344–1322 BC).

Egyptian power in Canaan thus suffered a major setback when the Hittites (or Hat.ti) advanced into Syria in the reign of Amenhotep III, and when they became even more threatening in that of his successor, displacing the Amorites and prompting a resumption of Semitic migration. Abdi-Ashirta and his son Aziru, at first afraid of the Hittites, afterwards made a treaty with their king, and joining with the Hittites, attacked and conquered the districts remaining loyal to Egypt. In vain did Rib-Hadda send touching appeals for aid to the distant Pharaoh, who was far too engaged in his religious innovations to attend to such messages.

The Amarna letters tell of the Habiri in northern Syria. Etakkama wrote thus to the Pharaoh:

Similarly, Zimrida, king of Sidon (named 'Siduna'), declared, "All my cities which the king has given into my hand, have come into the hand of the Habiri." The king of Jerusalem, Abdi-Heba, reported to the Pharaoh:

Abdi-heba's principal trouble arose from persons called Iilkili and the sons of Labaya, who are said to have entered into a treasonable league with the Habiri. Apparently this restless warrior found his death at the siege of Gina. All these princes, however, maligned each other in their letters to the Pharaoh, and protested their own innocence of traitorous intentions. Namyawaza, for instance, whom Etakkama (see above) accused of disloyalty, wrote thus to the Pharaoh,

Around the beginning of the New Kingdom period, Egypt exerted rule over much of the Levant. Rule remained strong during the Eighteenth Dynasty, but Egypt's rule became precarious during the Nineteenth and Twentieth Dynasties. Ramses II was able to maintain control over it in the stalemated battle against the Hittites at Kadesh in 1275 BC, but soon thereafter, the Hittites successfully took over the northern Levant (Syria and Amurru). Ramses II, obsessed with his own building projects while neglecting Asiatic contacts, allowed control over the region to continue dwindling. During the reign of his successor Merneptah, the Merneptah Stele was issued which claimed to have destroyed various sites in the southern Levant, including a people known as "Israel". However, archaeological findings show no destruction at any of the sites mentioned in the Merneptah Stele and so it is considered to be an exercise in propaganda, and the campaign most likely avoided the central highlands in the southern Levant. Egypt’s withdrawal from the southern Levant was a protracted process lasting some one hundred years beginning in the late 13th century BCE and ending close to the end of the 12th century BCE. The reason for the Egypt's withdrawal was most likely a product of the political turmoil in Egypt proper rather than the invasion by the Sea Peoples as there is little evidence that the Sea Peoples caused much destruction ca. 1200 BCE. Many Egyptian garrisons or sites with an “Egyptian governor’s residence” in the southern Levant were abandoned without destruction including Dier el-Balah, Ashkelon, Tel Mor, Tell el-Far'ah (South), Tel Gerisa, Tell Jemmeh, Tel Masos, and Qubur el-Walaydah. Not all Egyptian sites in the southern Levant were abandoned without destruction. The Egyptian garrison at Aphek was destroyed, likely in an act of warfare at the end of the 13th century. The Egyptian gate complex uncovered at Jaffa was destroyed at the end of the 12th century between 1134-1115 based on C14 dates, while Beth-Shean was partially though not completely destroyed, possibly by an earthquake, in the mid-12th century.

Amarna letters 

References to Canaanites are also found throughout the Amarna letters of Pharaoh Akhenaten  BC. In these letters, some of which were sent by governors and princes of Canaan to their Egyptian overlord Akhenaten (Amenhotep IV) in the 14th century BC, are found, beside Amar and Amurru (Amorites), the two forms Kinahhi and Kinahni, corresponding to Kena and Kena'an respectively, and including Syria in its widest extent, as Eduard Meyer has shown. The letters are written in the official and diplomatic East Semitic Akkadian language of Assyria and Babylonia, though "Canaanitish" words and idioms are also in evidence. The known references are:
 EA 8: Letter from Burna-Buriash II to Akhenaten, explaining that his merchants "were detained in Canaan for business matters", robbed and killed "in Hinnatuna of the land of Canaan" by the rulers of Acre and Shamhuna, and asks for compensation because "Canaan is your country"
 EA 9: Letter from Burna-Buriash II to Tutankhamun, "all the Canaanites wrote to Kurigalzu saying 'come to the border of the country so we can revolt and be allied with you'"
 EA 30: Letter from Tushratta: "To the kings of Canaan... Provide [my messenger] with safe entry into Egypt"
 EA 109: Letter of Rib-Hadda: "Previously, on seeing a man from Egypt, the kings of Canaan fled before him, but now the sons of Abdi-Ashirta make men from Egypt prowl about like dogs"
 EA 110: Letter of Rib-Hadda: "No ship of the army is to leave Canaan"
 EA 131: Letter of Rib-Hadda: "If he does not send archers, they will take [Byblos] and all the other cities, and the lands of Canaan will not belong to the king. May the king ask Yanhamu about these matters."
 EA 137: Letter of Rib-Hadda: "If the king neglects Byblos, of all the cities of Canaan not one will be his"
 EA 367: "Hani son (of) Mairēya, "chief of the stable" of the king in Canaan"
 EA 162: Letter to Aziru: "You yourself know that the king does not want to go against all of Canaan when he rages"
 EA 148: Letter from Abimilku to the Pharaoh: "[The king] has taken over the land of the king for the 'Apiru. May the king ask his commissioner, who is familiar with Canaan"
 EA 151: Letter from Abimilku to the Pharaoh: "The king, my lord wrote to me: 'write to me what you have heard from Canaan'." Abimilku describes in response what has happened in eastern Cilicia (Danuna), the northern coast of Syria (Ugarit), in Syria (Qadesh, Amurru, and Damascus) as well as in Sidon.

Other Late Bronze Age mentions 
Text RS 20.182 from Ugarit is a copy of a letter of the king of Ugarit to Ramesses II concerning money paid by "the sons of the land of Ugarit" to the "foreman of the sons of the land of Canaan (*kn'ny)" According to Jonathan Tubb, this suggests that the people of Ugarit, contrary to much modern opinion, considered themselves to be non-Canaanite.

The other Ugarit reference, KTU 4.96, shows a list of traders assigned to royal estates, of which one of the estates had three Ugaritans, an Ashdadite, an Egyptian and a Canaanite.

Ashur tablets
A Middle Assyrian letter during the reign of Shalmaneser I includes a reference to the "travel to Canaan" of an Assyrian official.

Hattusa letters
Four references are known from Hattusa:
 An evocation to the Cedar Gods: Includes reference to Canaan alongside Sidon, Tyre and possibly Amurru
 KBo XXVIII 1: Ramesses II letter to Hattusili III, in which Ramesses suggested he would meet "his brother" in Canaan and bring him to Egypt
 KUB III 57 (also KUB III 37 + KBo I 17): Broken text which may refer to Canaan as an Egyptian sub-district
 KBo I 15+19: Ramesses II letter to Hattusili III, describing Ramesses' visit to the "land of Canaan on his way to Kinza and Harita

Bronze Age collapse 

Ann Killebrew has shown that cities such as Jerusalem were large and important walled settlements in the pre-Israelite
Middle Bronze IIB and the Israelite Iron Age IIC period ( and  BC), but that during the intervening Late Bronze (LB) and Iron Age I and IIA/B Ages sites like Jerusalem were small and relatively insignificant and unfortified towns.

Just after the Amarna period, a new problem arose which was to trouble the Egyptian control of southern Canaan (the rest of the region now being under Assyrian control). Pharaoh Horemhab campaigned against Shasu (Egyptian = "wanderers") living in nomadic pastoralist tribes, who had moved across the Jordan River to threaten Egyptian trade through Galilee and Jezreel. Seti I ( BC) is said to have conquered these Shasu,  Semitic-speaking nomads living just south and east of the Dead Sea, from the fortress of Taru (Shtir?) to "Ka-n-'-na". After the near collapse of the Battle of Kadesh, Rameses II had to campaign vigorously in Canaan to maintain Egyptian power. Egyptian forces penetrated into Moab and Ammon, where a permanent fortress garrison (called simply "Rameses") was established.

Some believe the "Habiru" signified generally all the nomadic tribes known as "Hebrews", and particularly the early Israelites of the period of the "judges", who sought to appropriate the fertile region for themselves. However, the term was rarely used to describe the Shasu. Whether the term may also include other related ancient Semitic-speaking peoples such as the Moabites, Ammonites and Edomites is uncertain.

There is little evidence that any major city or settlement in the southern Levant was destroyed around 1200 BCE. At Lachish, The Fosse Temple III was ritually terminated while a house in Area S appears to have burned in a house fire as the most severe evidence of burning was next to two ovens while no other part of the city had evidence of burning. After this though the city was rebuilt in a grander fashion than before. For Megiddo, most parts of the city did not have any signs of damage and it is only possible that the palace in Area AA might have been destroyed though this is not certain. While the monumental structures at Hazor were indeed destroyed, this destruction was in the mid-13th century BCE long before the end of the Late Bronze Age began. However, many sites were not burned to the ground around 1200 BCE including: Ashkelon, Ashdod, Tell es-Safi, Tel Batash, Tel Burna, Tel Dor, Tel Gerisa, Tell Jemmeh, Khirbet Rabud, Tel Zeror, and Tell Abu Hawam among others.

Despite many theories which claim that trade relations broke down after 1200 BCE in the southern Levant, there is ample evidence that trade with other regions continued after the end of the Late Bronze Age in the Southern Levant. Archaeologist Jesse Millek has shown that while the common assuption is that trade in Cypriot and Mycenaean pottery ended around 1200 BCE, trade in Cypriot pottery actually largely came to an end at 1300, while for Mycenaean pottery, this trade ended at 1250 BCE, and destruction around 1200 BCE could not have affected either pattern of international trade since it ended before the end of the Late Bronze Age. He has also demonstrated that trade with Egypt continued after 1200 BCE. Archaeometallurgical studies performed by various teams have also shown that trade in tin, a non-local metal necessary to make bronze, did not stop or decrease after 1200 BCE, even though the closest source of the metal were modern Afghanistan, Kazakhstan, or perhaps even Cornwall, England. Lead from Sardinia was still being imported to the southern Levant after 1200 BCE during the early Iron Age.

Iron Age 

By the Early Iron Age, the southern Levant came to be dominated by the kingdoms of Israel and Judah, besides the Philistine city-states on the Mediterranean coast, and the kingdoms of Moab, Ammon, and Aram-Damascus east of the Jordan River, and Edom to the south. The northern Levant was divided into various petty kingdoms, the so-called Syro-Hittite states and the Phoenician city-states.

The entire region (including all Phoenician/Canaanite and Aramean states, together with Israel, Philistia, and Samarra) was conquered by the Neo-Assyrian Empire during the 10th and 9th centuries BC, and would remain so for three hundred years until the end of the 7th century BC. Emperor-kings such as Ashurnasirpal, Adad-nirari II, Sargon II, Tiglath-Pileser III, Esarhaddon, Sennacherib and Ashurbanipal came to dominate Canaanite affairs. During the Twenty-fifth Dynasty the Egyptians made a failed attempt to regain a foothold in the region, but were vanquished by the Neo-Assyrian Empire, leading to an Assyrian conquest of Egypt. Between 616 and 605 BC the Neo-Assyrian Empire collapsed due to a series of bitter civil wars, followed by an attack by an alliance of Babylonians, Medes, and Persians and the Scythians. The Neo-Babylonian Empire inherited the western part of the empire, including all the lands in Canaan and Syria, together with Kingdom of Israel and the Kingdom of Judah. They successfully defeated the Egyptians and remained in the region in an attempt to regain a foothold in the Near East.

The Neo-Babylonian Empire itself collapsed in 539 BC, and the region became a part of the Achaemenid Empire. It remained so until in 332 BC it was conquered by the Greeks under Alexander the Great, later to fall to the Roman Empire in the late 2nd century BC, and then Byzantium, until the Arab Islamic invasion and conquest of the 7th century AD.

Egyptian hieroglyphic and hieratic (1500–1000 BC) 

During the 2nd millennium BC, Ancient Egyptian texts use the term "Canaan" to refer to an Egyptian-ruled colony, whose boundaries generally corroborate the definition of Canaan found in the Hebrew Bible, bounded to the west by the Mediterranean Sea, to the north in the vicinity of Hamath in Syria, to the east by the Jordan Valley, and to the south by a line extended from the Dead Sea to around Gaza. Nevertheless, the Egyptian and Hebrew uses of the term are not identical: the Egyptian texts also identify the coastal city of Qadesh in north west Syria near Turkey as part of the "Land of Canaan", so that the Egyptian usage seems to refer to the entire Levantine coast of the Mediterranean Sea, making it a synonym of another Egyptian term for this coastland, Retjenu.

Lebanon, in northern Canaan, bordered by the Litani river to the watershed of the Orontes River, was known by the Egyptians as upper Retjenu. In Egyptian campaign accounts, the term Djahi was used to refer to the watershed of the Jordan river. Many earlier Egyptian sources also mention numerous military campaigns conducted in Ka-na-na, just inside Asia.

Archaeological attestation of the name "Canaan" in Ancient Near Eastern sources relates almost exclusively to the period in which the region operated as a colony of the New Kingdom of Egypt (16th–11th centuries BC), with usage of the name almost disappearing following the Late Bronze Age collapse ( BC). The references suggest that during this period the term was familiar to the region's neighbors on all sides, although scholars have disputed to what extent such references provide a coherent description of its location and boundaries, and regarding whether the inhabitants used the term to describe themselves.

16 references are known in Egyptian sources, from the Eighteenth Dynasty of Egypt onwards.
 Amenhotep II inscriptions: Canaanites are included in a list of prisoners of war
 Three topographical lists
 Papyrus Anastasi I 27,1" refers to the route from Sile to Gaza "the [foreign countries] of the end of the land of Canaan"
 Merneptah Stele
 Papyrus Anastasi IIIA 5–6 and Papyrus Anastasi IV 16,4 refer to "Canaanite slaves from Hurru"
 Papyrus Harris After the collapse of the Levant under the so-called "Peoples of the Sea" Ramesses III ( BC) is said to have built a temple to the god Amen to receive tribute from the southern Levant. This was described as being built in Pa-Canaan, a geographical reference whose meaning is disputed, with suggestions that it may refer to the city of Gaza or to the entire Egyptian-occupied territory in the south west corner of the Near East.

Greco-Roman historiography 

The Greek term Phoenicia is first attested in the first two works of Western literature, Homer's Iliad and Odyssey. It does not occur in the Hebrew Bible, but occurs three times in the New Testament in the Book of Acts. In the 6th century BC, Hecataeus of Miletus affirms that Phoenicia was formerly called , a name that Philo of Byblos subsequently adopted into his mythology as his eponym for the Phoenicians: "Khna who was afterwards called Phoinix". Quoting fragments attributed to Sanchuniathon, he relates that Byblos, Berytus and Tyre were among the first cities ever built, under the rule of the mythical Cronus, and credits the inhabitants with developing fishing, hunting, agriculture, shipbuilding and writing.

Coins of the city of Beirut / Laodicea bear the legend, "Of Laodicea, a metropolis in Canaan"; these coins are dated to the reign of Antiochus IV (175–164 BC) and his successors until 123 BC.
Saint Augustine also mentions that one of the terms the seafaring Phoenicians called their homeland was "Canaan". Augustine also records that the rustic people of Hippo in North Africa retained the Punic self-designation Chanani. Since 'punic' in Latin also meant 'non-Roman', some scholars however argue that the language referred to as Punic in Augustine may have been Libyan.

The Greeks also popularized the term Palestine, named after the Philistines or the Aegean Pelasgians, for roughly the region of Canaan, excluding Phoenicia, with Herodotus' first recorded use of Palaistinê,  BC. From 110 BC, the Hasmoneans extended their authority over much of the region, creating a Judean-Samaritan-Idumaean-Ituraean-Galilean alliance. The Judean (Jewish, see Ioudaioi) control over the wider area resulted in it also becoming known as Judaea, a term that had previously only referred to the smaller region of the Judean Mountains, the allotment of the Tribe of Judah and heartland of the former Kingdom of Judah. Between 73–63 BC, the Roman Republic extended its influence into the region in the Third Mithridatic War, conquering Judea in 63 BC, and splitting the former Hasmonean Kingdom into five districts. Around 130–135 AD, as a result of the suppression of the Bar Kochba revolt, the province of Iudaea was joined with Galilee to form new province of Syria Palaestina. There is circumstantial evidence linking Hadrian with the name change, although the precise date is not certain, and the interpretation of some scholars that the name change may have been intended "to complete the dissociation with Judaea" is disputed.

Later sources 
Padiiset's Statue is the last known Egyptian reference to Canaan, a small statuette labelled "Envoy of the Canaan and of Peleset, Pa-di-Eset, the son of Apy". The inscription is dated to 900–850 BC, more than 300 years after the preceding known inscription.

During the period from  BC, the dominant Neo-Assyrian and Achaemenid Empire make no mention of Canaan.

Canaanites
The Canaanites were the inhabitants of ancient Canaan, a region that roughly corresponds to present-day Israel and the Palestinian Territories, western Jordan, southern and coastal Syria, Lebanon, and continued up to the southern border of Turkey. They are believed to have been one of the oldest civilizations in human history.

History
The Levant was inhabited by people who referred to the land as ca-na-na-um as early as the mid-third millennium BCE. The Akkadian word "kinahhu" referred to the purple-coloured wool, dyed from the Murex molluscs of the coast—which was a key export of the region. When the ancient Greeks later traded with the Canaanites, this meaning of the word seems to have predominated, as they referred to the Canaanites as Phoenikes (Phoenicians), which may derive from the Greek-language word "phoenix", and also described the cloth for which the Greeks traded. The word "phoenix" was transcribed by the Romans to "poenus"; the descendants of the Canaanite settlers in Carthage were likewise referred to as Punic.

Thus, while "Phoenician" and "Canaanite" refer to the same culture, archaeologists and historians commonly refer to the Bronze Age pre-1200 BCE Levantine peoples as Canaanites, while their Iron Age descendants, particularly those living on the coast, are referred to as Phoenicians. More recently, the term "Canaanite" has been used for the secondary Iron Age states of the Levantine interior that were not ruled by Aramean peoples, that is, that were ruled by a separate and closely-related ethnic group which included the Philistines and the Israelite kingdoms of Israel and Judah.

Culture 

Canaan included what today are Lebanon, Israel, Palestine, northwestern Jordan, and some western areas of Syria. According to archaeologist Jonathan N. Tubb, "Ammonites, Moabites, Israelites, and Phoenicians undoubtedly achieved their own cultural identities, and yet ethnically they were all Canaanites", "the same people who settled in farming villages in the region in the 8th millennium BCE."

There is uncertainty about whether the name "Canaan" refers to a specific Semitic-speaking ethnic group wherever they live, the homeland of this ethnic group, a region under the control of this ethnic group, or perhaps any combination of the three.

Canaanite civilization was a response to long periods of stable climate interrupted by short periods of climate change. During these periods, Canaanites profited from their intermediary position between the ancient civilizations of the Middle East—Ancient Egypt, Mesopotamia (Sumer, Akkad, Assyria, Babylonia), the Hittites, and Minoan Crete—to become city states of merchant princes along the coast, with small kingdoms specializing in agricultural products in the interior. This polarity, between coastal towns and agrarian hinterland, was illustrated in Canaanite mythology by the struggle between the storm god, variously called Teshub (Hurrian) or Ba'al Hadad (Semitic Amorite/Aramean) and Ya'a, Yaw, or Yam, god of the sea and rivers. Early Canaanite civilization was characterized by small walled market towns, surrounded by peasant farmers growing a range of local horticultural products, along with commercial growing of olives, grapes for wine, and pistachios, surrounded by extensive grain cropping, predominantly wheat and barley. Harvest in early summer was a season when transhumance nomadism was practiced—shepherds staying with their flocks during the wet season and returning to graze them on the harvested stubble, closer to water supplies in the summer. Evidence of this cycle of agriculture is found in the Gezer calendar and in the biblical cycle of the year.

Periods of rapid climate change generally saw a collapse of this mixed Mediterranean farming system; commercial production was replaced with subsistence agricultural foodstuffs; and transhumance pastoralism became a year-round nomadic pastoral activity, whilst tribal groups wandered in a circular pattern north to the Euphrates, or south to the Egyptian delta with their flocks. Occasionally, tribal chieftains would emerge, raiding enemy settlements and rewarding loyal followers from the spoils or by tariffs levied on merchants. Should the cities band together and retaliate, a neighbouring state intervene or should the chieftain suffer a reversal of fortune, allies would fall away or intertribal feuding would return. It has been suggested that the Patriarchal tales of the Bible reflect such social forms. During the periods of the collapse of Akkadian Empire in Mesopotamia and the First Intermediate Period of Egypt, the Hyksos invasions and the end of the Middle Bronze Age in Assyria and Babylonia, and the Late Bronze Age collapse, trade through the Canaanite area would dwindle, as Egypt, Babylonia, and to a lesser degree Assyria, withdrew into their isolation. When the climates stabilized, trade would resume firstly along the coast in the area of the Philistine and Phoenician cities. As markets redeveloped, new trade routes that would avoid the heavy tariffs of the coast would develop from Kadesh Barnea, through Hebron, Lachish, Jerusalem, Bethel, Samaria, Shechem, Shiloh through Galilee to Jezreel, Hazor, and Megiddo. Secondary Canaanite cities would develop in this region. Further economic development would see the creation of a third trade route from Eilath, Timna, Edom (Seir), Moab, Ammon, and thence to the Aramean states of Damascus and Palmyra. Earlier states (for example the Philistines and Tyrians in the case of Judah and Samaria, for the second route, and Judah and Israel for the third route) tried generally unsuccessfully to control the interior trade.

Eventually, the prosperity of this trade would attract more powerful regional neighbours, such as Ancient Egypt, Assyria, the Babylonians, Persians, Ancient Greeks, and Romans, who would control the Canaanites politically, levying tribute, taxes, and tariffs. Often in such periods, thorough overgrazing would result in a climatic collapse and a repeat of the cycle (e.g., PPNB, Ghassulian, Uruk, and the Bronze Age cycles already mentioned). The fall of later Canaanite civilization occurred with the incorporation of the area into the Greco-Roman world (as Iudaea province), and after Byzantine times, into the Muslim Arab and proto-Muslim Umayyad Caliphate. Western Aramaic, one of the two lingua francas of Canaanite civilization, is still spoken in a number of small Syrian villages, whilst Phoenician Canaanite disappeared as a spoken language in about 100 CE. A separate Akkadian-infused Eastern Aramaic is still spoken by the existing Assyrians of Iraq, Iran, northeast Syria, and southeast Turkey.

Tel Kabri contains the remains of a Canaanite city from the Middle Bronze Age (2000–1550 BCE). The city, the most important of the cities in the Western Galilee during that period, had a palace at its center. Tel Kabri is the only Canaanite city that can be excavated in its entirety because after the city was abandoned, no other city was built over its remains. It is notable because the predominant extra-Canaanite cultural influence is Minoan; Minoan-style frescoes decorate the palace.

Significant figures

Figures mentioned in historiography or known through archaeology

Confirmed archaeologically
 Niqmaddu I of Ugarit (Known from a seal used by Ugaritan Kings)
 Yaqarum I of Ugarit (Known from a seal used by Ugaritan Kings)
 Ammittamru I of Ugarit (Amarna letters)
 Niqmaddu II of Ugarit (Amarna letters) (1349–1315 BCE)
 Arhalba of Ugarit (1315–1313 BCE)
 Niqmepa of Ugarit (1313–1260 BCE)
 Ammittamru II of Ugarit (1260–1235 BCE)
 Ibiranu of Ugarit (1235–1220 BCE)
 Ammurapi of Ugarit (1215–1185 BCE)
 Aziru, ruler of Amurru (Amarna letters)
 Labaya, lord of Shechem (Amarna letters)
 Abdi-Heba, local chieftain of pre-Israelite Jerusalem (Jebus) (Amarna letters)
 Šuwardata, king of the Canaanite city of Gath or 'mayor' of Qiltu (Amarna letters)

Rulers of Tyre
 Abibaal 990–978 BCE
 Hiram I 978–944 BCE
 Baal-Eser I (Balbazer I) 944–927 BCE
 Abdastartus 927–918 BCE
 Methusastartus 918–906 BCE
 Astarymus 906–897 BCE
 Phelles 897–896 BCE
 Ithobaal I 896–863 BCE
 Baal-Eser II (Balbazer II) 863–829 BCE
 Mattan I 829–820 BCE
 Pygmalion 820–774 BCE
 Ithobaal II 750–739 BCE
 Hiram II 739–730 BCE
 Mattan II 730–729 BCE
 Luli 729 694 BCE
 Abd Melqart 694–680 BCE
 Baal I 680–660 BCE
Note:Tyre may have been under control of Assyria and/or Egypt for 70 years
 Eshbaal III 591–573 BCE – Carthage became independent of Tyre in 574 BCE
 Baal II 573–564 BCE (under Babylonian overlords)
 Yakinbaal 564 BCE
 Chelbes 564–563 BCE
 Abbar 563–562 BCE
 Mattan III and Ger Ashthari 562–556 BCE
 Baal-Eser III 556–555 BCE
 Mahar-Baal 555–551 BCE
 Hiram III 551–532 BCE
 Mattan III (under Persian control)
 Boulomenus
 Abdemon  BCE

Legends
 Cronos (Ilus), founder of Byblos according to Sanchuniathon
 Makamaron, king of Canaan (Jubilees 46:6)

Characters in the Hebrew Bible
 Canaan, son of Ham (Gen. 10:6)
 Sidon, firstborn son of Canaan (Gen. 10:15)
 Heth, son of Canaan (Gen. 10:15)
 Sihon, king of Amorites (Deut 1:4)
 Og, king of Bashan (Deut 1:4)
 Adonizedek, king of Jerusalem (Josh. 10:1)
 Debir, king of Eglon (Josh. 10:3)
 Jabin, name of two kings of Hazor (Josh. 11:1; Judges 5:6)

Genetic studies 

A 2020 genetic analysis has found that the Bronze Age Canaanite population descended from earlier local Neolithic populations together with populations related to the Chalcolithic Zagros Mountains and the Bronze Age Caucasus. According to the researchers, this mixture is probably the result of a continuing migration from the Zagros and/or Caucasus to the Levant between 2500–1000 BCE. The study has also shown that the Canaanite population contributed to most present-day Jewish groups and Levantine Arabic-speaking groups. These populations are consistent with having 50% or more of their ancestry from people related to groups who lived in the Bronze Age Levant and the Chalcolithic Zagros. These present-day groups also show ancestries that cannot be modeled by the available ancient DNA data, highlighting the importance of additional major genetic effects on the region since the Bronze Age.

In Jewish and Christian scriptures

Hebrew Bible 
Canaan and the Canaanites are mentioned some 160 times in the Hebrew Bible, mostly in the Torah and the books of Joshua and Judges. The biblical history has become increasingly problematic as the archaeological and textual evidence supports the idea that the early Israelites were in fact themselves Canaanites. While the Hebrew Bible distinguishes the Canaanites ethnically from the ancient Israelites, modern scholars Jonathan Tubb and Mark S. Smith have theorized—based on their archaeological and linguistic interpretations—that the Kingdom of Israel and the Kingdom of Judah represented a subset of Canaanite culture.

In the Hebrew Bible an ancestor called Canaan first appears as one of Noah's grandsons. He appears during the narrative known as the curse of Ham, in which Canaan is cursed with perpetual slavery because his father Ham had "looked upon" the drunk and naked Noah. The expression "look upon" at times has sexual overtones in the Bible, as in Leviticus 20:11, "The man who lies with his father's wife has uncovered his father's nakedness..." As a result, interpreters have proposed a variety of possibilities as to what kind of transgression has been committed by Ham, including the possibility that maternal incest is implied.

The passage in the Book of Genesis often called the Table of Nations presents the Canaanites as descendants of Canaan,. Genesis 10:15–19 states:

Canaanite populations are said to have inhabited the Mediterranean coastlands, including Lebanon corresponding to Phoenicia and the Gaza Strip corresponding to Philistia and the Jordan Valley.

The Philistines, while an integral part of the Canaanite milieu, do not seem to have been ethnic Canaanites, and were listed in the Table of Nations as descendants of Mizraim. The Arameans, Moabites, Ammonites, Midianites and Edomites were also considered fellow descendants of Shem or Abraham, and distinct from generic Canaanites/Amorites. Heth, representing the Hittites, is a son of Canaan. The later Hittites spoke an Indo-European language (called Nesili), but their predecessors the Hattians had spoken a little-known language (Hattili), of uncertain affinities.

The Horites, formerly of Mount Seir, were implied to be Canaanite (Hivite), although unusually there is no direct confirmation of this in the narrative. The Hurrians, based in Upper Mesopotamia, spoke the Hurrian language.

Biblical borders
In biblical usage, the name was confined to the country west of the Jordan River. The Canaanites were described as living "by the sea, and along by the side of the Jordan" (Book of Numbers 13:29) and "around Jordan" (Book of Joshua 22:9). John N. Oswalt notes that "Canaan consists of the land west of the Jordan and is distinguished from the area east of the Jordan." Oswalt then goes on to say that in Scripture, Canaan "takes on a theological character" as "the land which is God's gift" and "the place of abundance". The Book of Numbers, 34:2, includes the phrase "the land of Canaan as defined by its borders." The borders are then delineated in Numbers 34:3–12. The term "Canaanites" in biblical Hebrew is applied especially to the inhabitants of the lower regions, along the sea coast and on the shores of the Jordan River, as opposed to the inhabitants of the mountainous regions.

Conquest of Canaan

Yahweh promises the land of Canaan to Abraham in the Book of Genesis. and eventually delivers it to descendants of Abraham, the Israelites. The Hebrew Bible describes the Israelite conquest of Canaan in the "Former Prophets", viz. the books of Joshua, Judges, Samuel, and Kings. These books give the narrative of the Israelites after the death of Moses and their entry into Canaan under the leadership of Joshua. The renaming of the Land of Canaan as the Land of Israel marks the Israelite conquest of the Promised Land.

The Canaanites are said to have been one of seven regional ethnic divisions or "nations" driven out by the Israelites following the Exodus. Specifically, the other nations include the Hittites, the Girgashites, the Amorites, the Perizzites, the Hivites, and the Jebusites. One of the 613 commandments prescribes that no inhabitants of the cities of six Canaanite nations, the same as mentioned in 7:1, minus the Girgashites, were to be left alive..

In 738 BC, the Neo-Assyrian empire conquered the Kingdom of Israel. In 586 BC, the Kingdom of Judah was annexed into the Neo-Babylonian Empire. The city of Jerusalem fell after a siege which lasted either eighteen or thirty months. By 586 BC, much of Judah was devastated, and the former kingdom suffered a steep decline of both economy and population.

New Testament 
"Canaan" is used only twice in the New Testament: both times in Acts of the Apostles when paraphrasing Old Testament stories. Additionally, the derivative  ("Canaanite woman") is used in Matthew's version of the exorcism of the Syrophoenician woman's daughter, while the Gospel of Mark uses the term .

Uses of the name
By the Second Temple period (530 BC – 70 AD), "Canaanite" in the Hebrew language had come to be not an ethnic designation, so much as a general synonym for "merchant", as it is interpreted in, for example, Book of Job 40:30, or Book of Proverbs 31:24.

The name "Canaanites" is attested as the endonym of the people later known to the Ancient Greeks from  BC as Phoenicians, and following the emigration of Canaanite-speakers to Carthage (founded in the 9th century BC), was also used as a self-designation by the Punics (chanani) of North Africa during Late Antiquity. This mirrors usage of the names Canaanites and Phoenicians in later books of the Hebrew Bible (such as at the end of the Book of Zechariah, where it is thought to refer to a class of merchants or to non-monotheistic worshippers in Israel or neighbouring Sidon and Tyre), as well as in its single independent usage in the New Testament (where it alternates with the term "Syrophoenician" in two parallel passages).

The Septuagint (3rd and 2nd century BC) translates Canaan as "Phoenicia".

Legacy 
"Canaan" is used as a synonym of the Promised Land; for instance, it is used in this sense in the hymn "Canaan's Happy Shore", with the lines: "Oh, brothers, will you meet me, (3x)/On Canaan's happy shore," a hymn set to the tune later used in The Battle Hymn of the Republic.

In the 1930s and 1940s, some Revisionist Zionist intellectuals in Mandatory Palestine founded the ideology of Canaanism, which sought to create a unique Hebrew identity, rooted in ancient Canaanite culture, rather than a Jewish one.

See also 
 Amarna letters–localities and their rulers
 Canaanite and Aramaic inscriptions
 Canaanite gate of ancient Tell
 Canaanite shift
 Curse of Canaan
 Names of the Levant
 Proto-Canaanite alphabet
 Knanaya
 Ugarit
 Yahwism

Citations

General bibliography

External links 

 Canaan & Ancient Israel, University of Pennsylvania Museum of Archaeology and Anthropology. Explores their identities (land-time, daily life, economy & religion) in pre-historical times through the material remains that they have left behind.
 Catholic Encyclopedia.
 Antiquities of the Jews by Flavius Josephus.
 When Canaanites and Philistines Ruled Ashkelon Biblical Archaeology Society

 
Amarna letters locations
Ancient history of Jordan
Land of Israel